Leivi is a town and comune in the Metropolitan City of Genoa, in the Liguria region of northwest Italy.

Leivi sits in the Apennine hills,  from the town of Chiavari, overlooking the Gulf of Tigullio.

It is a centre for the production of olive oil.

References

Cities and towns in Liguria